Alfred Zampa (March 12, 1905 – April 23, 2000) was an American iron worker who played a role in the construction of numerous San Francisco Bay Area bridges during the early twentieth century. He was most notable for being one of the first people to survive falling off the Golden Gate Bridge. He was a charter member of the Half Way to Hell Club, whose members are the men who fell from the Golden Gate Bridge and were saved by the nets.

Life and career
Zampa was born in Selby, California. He retired from the position of iron worker at the age of 65 in 1970, and died at the age of 95 in Tormey, California. Zampa's parents were born in Ortuchio, a village in the Italian region of Abruzzo; there is now a square in the village named Piazza Alfred Zampa in his honor.

Cultural influence
In 1987 writer Isabelle Maynard wrote and produced a play titled "The Ace" chronicling Zampa's exploits on the Golden Gate Bridge and the formation of the Half Way to Hell Club. "The Ace" was based on Zampa's life and was advertised as an "iron worker's story of heroism, risk and recognition on the Golden Gate Bridge." It was well-received on San Francisco stages, especially during the bridge's 50th anniversary year. The Alfred Zampa Memorial Bridge is named in his honor. The new bridge replaced the 1927 span of the Carquinez Bridge which Zampa helped construct, beginning at the age of 20.

External links
 AlZampaBridge.com Official site of the Alfred Zampa Memorial Bridge

References

Robinson, John V. Spanning the Strait: Building the Alfred Zampa Memorial Bridge. Crockett, CA: Carquinez Press. (2004)
Robinson, John V. Al Zampa and the Bay Area Bridges. San Francisco: Arcadia Publishing.  (2005)
Robinson, John V.Bay Area Iron Master Al Zampa: A Life Building Bridges.Charleston, SC: The History Press. (2015)
Schwartz, Harvey. Building the Golden Gate Bridge: A Workers' Oral History. Seattle:U of Washington Press. (2015)

1905 births
2000 deaths
Bridge engineers
People from Contra Costa County, California
Engineers from California
20th-century American engineers